The 2006 Korea Open in badminton was held in Seoul, from August 21 to August 27, 2006.

The prize money was US$300,000.

Venue
Jangchung Gymnasium

Results

Men's singles

Women's singles

Men's doubles

Women's doubles

Mixed doubles

External links
2006 Korea Open

Korea Open
Korea Open
Korea Open (badminton)
Sport in Seoul